The Lompoc earthquake of 1927 occurred at 5:49 a.m. Pacific Standard Time (PST), on November 4 with an epicenter off the coast of Lompoc, Santa Barbara County in Southern California. It is one of the largest earthquakes to have occurred off the coast of California, measuring a surface-wave magnitude of 7.3. The earthquake may have originated along the Hosgri Fault, an entirely offshore structure. Shaking from the earthquake and an unusually large tsunami caused some damage to communities near the earthquake. Due to its location and the area being sparsely populated at the time, there were no human fatalities reported. It is the only California-generated tsunami recorded in Hawaii.

Geology 

The San Simeon-Hosgri Fault is an approximately 140 km long, complex thrust or reverse fault that runs offshore, with an 18 km section that is on land. The fault has an almost north-south strike and east dip. It is a system of interlaced and parallel faults that form this structure. It lies sub-parallel to the San Andreas Fault and is part of a system of faults that accommodate motion between the North American and Pacific Plate. The fault poses a hazard to the Diablo Canyon Power Plant, which sits a few kilometers from the fault. Following the Fukushima Daichi nuclear accident, caused by an earthquake, there have been concerns of a nuclear disaster involving the power plant. The onshore San Simeon Fault triggered the 2003 earthquake that killed two people.

Earthquake 
The epicenter was located 80 km west of Point Arguello. Large landslides happened along coast around the Santa Barbara district and railway services were suspended. Flues and chimneys were damaged at Lompoc and other surrounding towns. In the town of Surf, people were thrown from standing and reclining positions, a concrete road cracked, a rail bridge was thrown out of position, and sand and water erupted from sand blows, indicating that liquefaction took place because of the earthquake. Shaking intensity reached a maximum of X (Extremely high intensity tremor) on the Rossi-Forel scale, while intensities VIII–VI covered a larger region. Shock from the earthquake apparently stunned and killed many fishes near the epicenter.

Tsunami 
The earthquake triggered a tsunami that reached a maximum height of 2 meters was seen at Surf and Pismo beach, and was 1.2 meters at Port San Luis. The tsunami measured 7 cm at La Jolla, San Diego. A positive wave was sent in the direction towards the California coast, as reported by eyewitnesses that there was no receding of the seawater before the waves hit. Tide gauges in Hawaii measured the tsunamis at 2 cm at Honolulu and 10 cm at Hilo.

See also 
 List of earthquakes in California
 List of historical earthquakes
 1812 Ventura earthquake

References 

Earthquakes in California
Lompoc
Tsunamis in the United States
History of Santa Barbara County, California
Earthquake,Lompoc
Earthquake,Lompoc
Lompoc, California
Santa Barbara, California
History of Santa Barbara, California